Playing for Time is a 1980 CBS television film, written by Arthur Miller and based on acclaimed musician Fania Fénelon's autobiography The Musicians of Auschwitz. Vanessa Redgrave stars as Fénelon.

Playing for Time was based on Fénelon's experience as a female prisoner in the Auschwitz concentration camp, where she and a group of classical musicians were spared in return for performing music for their captors. The film was later adapted as a play by Miller.

This was the last film of director Daniel Mann. Parts of the film were directed by Joseph Sargent, but only Mann was credited as director.

Plot
Fania Fénelon, a French Jewish singer-pianist, is sent with other prisoners to the Auschwitz concentration camp in a crowded train during World War II. After having their belongings and clothes taken and their heads shaved, the prisoners are processed and enter the camp. Fénelon is recognized as being a famous musician and she finds that she will be able to avoid hard manual labor and survive longer by becoming a member of the prison's female orchestra, the Women's Orchestra of Auschwitz.

In the process, she strikes up a close relationship with Alma Rosé, the musical group's leader, as well as the other members of the band. Realizing that the musicians get better treatment than other prisoners, Fania convinces the guards and members of the orchestra that another prisoner she had befriended, Marianne, is actually a talented singer. Although Marianne performs poorly at her audition, she is allowed to join the orchestra. Playing for the Nazis, however, robs the women of much of their dignity and most of them are often questioning whether remaining alive was worth the abuse they constantly suffer.

Cast

 Vanessa Redgrave as Fania Fénelon
 Jane Alexander as Alma Rosé
 Maud Adams as Mala Zimetbaum
 Christine Baranski as Olga
 Robin Bartlett as Etalina
 Marisa Berenson as Elzvieta
 Verna Bloom as Paulette
 Donna Haley as Katrina
 Lenore Harris as Charlotte
 Mady Kaplan as Varya
 Will Lee as Shmuel
 Anna Levine as Michou
 Shirley Knight as SS-Lagerführerin Maria Mandel
 Viveca Lindfors as Frau Schmidt
 Max Wright as SS Doctor Joseph Mengele
 Melanie Mayron as Marianne
 Marcell Rosenblatt as Giselle
 Martha Schlamme as woman on train

Production
The cast rehearsed together in New York City and subsequently filmed in Pennsylvania on a six-week shooting schedule. During the half-way stage of shooting the producers decided to replace Joseph Sargent with Daniel Mann as director.

It is also notable as one of the first film productions where an ensemble of actresses shaved their heads for the sake of their roles.

Casting controversy
The producer Linda Yellen was determined to cast Redgrave in the lead role at a time when the actress was facing protests from Jewish organizations for her criticism of Zionism and her pro-Palestinian position. Subsequently, security was required at rehearsals and Yellen's office was broken into. There were further complications when Fénelon herself appeared on CBS's 60 Minutes arguing against Redgrave's casting and suggested Jane Fonda or Liza Minnelli as a replacement. During the production Fénelon continued to criticize Redgrave's politics on her speaking tours across the USA. Actresses on the project had also been contacted with the view of making a statement against Redgrave's casting. They refused and instead released a press release denouncing blacklisting and expressed their desire to work with Redgrave.

As a result of Redgrave's political views, the film was initially banned in Israel, although she appealed to Jordan's culture minister to buy the rights to the film to show on Jordanian television. She wished that both Arabs and Israelis should have the opportunity to see the film.

Reception
Playing for Time was praised by critics and garnered several awards and nominations;   It was the most viewed prime time program on United States television for the week of its release in 1980, with a rating of 26.2, watched in 20.4 million homes.

Primetime Emmy Award

Primetime Emmy Award for Outstanding Made for Television Movie (won)
Primetime Emmy Award for Outstanding Lead Actress in a Miniseries or a Movie - Vanessa Redgrave (won)
Primetime Emmy Award for Outstanding Supporting Actress in a Miniseries or a Movie - Jane Alexander (won)
Primetime Emmy Award for Outstanding Writing for a Miniseries, Movie or a Dramatic Special - Arthur Miller (won)
Primetime Emmy Award Outstanding Art Direction for a Limited Series or a Special - Robert Gundlach, Gary Jones (nomination)
Primetime Emmy Award for Outstanding Supporting Actress in a Miniseries or a Movie - Shirley Knight (nomination)

Golden Globe Award
Golden Globe Award for Best Miniseries or Television Film (nomination)

Peabody Award
Peabody Award for CBS area of excellence

DVD release
After its television broadcast, the film was released on VHS, and later on DVD in the United States in 2010.

Historical controversy

Playing for Time the movie, and the memoir upon which it is based, have assumed an important place in Holocaust scholarship. Since its publication and tremendous commercial success, Fénelon's testimony has been accepted as truth and widely dispersed in a plethora of academic, popular, and musical resources. This has proved a source of great frustration and heartache for the other survivors of the orchestra, who almost unanimously found Fania's representation of their orchestra and its personnel false and demeaning. They have fought a fierce battle in the decades since Playing for Time appeared to have their version of the orchestra and its history represented. 

Some attention has been paid to their concerns, but in large part they have been ignored. The greatest sources of anguish are the supposed inaccurate portrayal of Alma Rosé, the alleged slanderous portrayals of many of the other musicians, and the portrayed diminishment by Fénelon of their bond and support for one another.

References

External links

Playing for Time at Yahoo! Movies
Playing for Time at Film.com
Playing for Time - main symbols

1980 television films
1980 films
1980 drama films
Films about Jews and Judaism
Holocaust films
American war drama films
Musical films based on actual events
Films based on biographies
Films set in Poland
Films shot in Pennsylvania
Peabody Award-winning broadcasts
Primetime Emmy Award for Outstanding Made for Television Movie winners
Films directed by Daniel Mann
Films scored by Brad Fiedel
Cultural depictions of Josef Mengele
American drama television films
1980s English-language films
1980s American films
Casting controversies in film
Political controversies in film